Chair Airlines AG, branded as chair and formerly named Germania Flug, is a Swiss airline headquartered in Glattbrugg in Greater Zurich and based at Zürich Airport.

History

Germania Flug
The airline was founded in August 2014, in cooperation with the German airline Germania (which also lent its corporate design) and Swiss leisure company Hotelplan, with the aim to operate leisure charter flights using the brand HolidayJet. Following the inaugural flight on 26 March 2015, for the summer of 2015, Germania Flug operated from Zürich to 17 leisure destinations in Europe and North Africa. It was planned to continue operating the same for the winter of 2015/2016.

However, from November 2015, Germania Flug stopped its collaboration with HolidayJet and has operated solely under its own brand name since then. In summer 2016, Germania Flug operated scheduled flights around Europe, Turkey, Lebanon, and North Africa. In addition to this, it served Pristina and Skopje on behalf of virtual airline Air Prishtina.

Chair Airlines
Germania Flug was not affected by the bankruptcy of its then German shareholder Germania in February 2019, and continued its operations under this name. Shortly after that, it was announced that all shares formerly held by the German Germania branch had been sold to Albex Aviation, which also owns Air Prishtina. On 11 June 2019 the airline was rebranded Chair Airlines.

Destinations 
As of June 2019, Chair Airlines operates flights to the following regularly scheduled and seasonal destinations under its own brand name:

Fleet 

The Chair Airlines fleet consists of the following aircraft (as of October 2021):

Historic fleet 
 1 Boeing 737-800 (Leased from Enter Air)

References

External links 

 Official website

Airlines of Switzerland
Airlines established in 2014
Swiss companies established in 2014
Companies based in the canton of Zürich